, formerly known as Tokyo Yūbin Chokin Kaikan, is
a multi-purpose facility located in Shiba Park, Minato, Tokyo, Japan. It opened in 1971 and was given its current name in 2007. It is one of eleven Mielparque facilities located in Japan. The building contains restaurants, conference facilities, hotel accommodations, and a 1,582-seat multi-purpose event hall which has featured concerts by performers such as Bill Evans, Judas Priest, Robert Plant, Stevie Ray Vaughan, Devo, Motörhead, Hall & Oates,  and Art Pepper .

References

External links
 

Concert halls in Japan
Music venues in Tokyo
Buildings and structures in Minato, Tokyo
Japan Post Holdings
Music venues completed in 1971
1971 establishments in Japan